Vicente Sebastian Pintado y Brito (February 20, 1774 -  August 20, 1829) was a Spanish cartographer, engineer, military officer and land surveyor of Spanish Louisiana and Spanish West Florida.  He is known for conducting surveys of lands for settlers who had requested grants in Louisiana and Florida, as well as the so-called "Pintado plan", a street map of Pensacola drawn in 1812 which included the position and size of the solares designated for construction of the city's church and other public buildings. He lived more than 35 years in the Americas (25 of them in Louisiana and Florida) and left a large corpus of work consisting of maps, plats, letters and documents vital to an understanding of the complicated sale of lands in Florida and Louisiana during the period. In 1974, the Library of Congress in Washington, D.C. obtained a donation of the Pintado Collection, a collection of about 1,500 documents now stored in its Division of Manuscripts.

Biography

Early years 
Vicente Sebastian Pintado was born on February 20, 1774, in Santa Cruz de La Palma (Canary Islands, Spain). His parents were Diego Eligio Pintado and Antonia de Brito y Salazax. Although little is known of his youth, he would be expected to have had a good background in mathematics and design.

It is known that Pintado entered the Spanish military in his youth, where he excelled and was promoted to an officer's rank. In 1793, Pintado sailed for Havana, Cuba aboard the barque La Hermosa María Yendo de Campo. During its passage north of Tolvos island he prepared a maritime chart of latitudes, this being his first commission as a cartographer.  From Havana, he was ordered to Louisiana, a Spanish province at the time.

Louisiana 
In 1794-1795, Pintado served under baron Francisco Luis Héctor de Carondelet, the governor of Louisiana and West Florida, headquartered at New Orleans. Carondelet entrusted him with the command of a sloop to carry out various commissions, operating from the Spanish fort San Juan del Bayou that protected the Lake Pontchartrain entrance of Bayou St. John and Lake Borgne, often carrying letters from Carondelet to the Captain General of Cuba, Luis de las Casas.

In 1795, at the behest of Carondolet, Pintado led a survey of the lands around the fort at Christian Pass (Pasa Cristian),  as well as 1,300 acres of land on the banks of the Carondelet Canal belonging to Jean Baptiste Macarty, colonel of the militia of New Orleans. Pintado subsequently performed numerous other surveys in Louisiana.

In 1796 Carondelet commissioned Pintado to conduct a survey of lands granted to Ambrosio Longue-Épée in Iberville County on the west bank of the Mississippi River opposite Baton Rouge. After the work was completed,  on May 1 of that year Carondelet appointed him assistant surveyor of Spanish Louisiana, an office he occupied from 1796 to 1805.  
In 1797, Carondelet instructed Pintado to do surveys in the district of New Feliciana north of Baton Rouge, and in 1798 he served as captain of militias raised in the same district. The following year he bought some land near Baton Rouge.

On April 1, 1800, Pintado was appointed mayor and commandant of the militia in Bayou Sara, near the modern city of St. Francisville on the Mississippi River, replacing the late Captain Anselmo Blanchard. After the recovery of Louisiana by France in 1801 and its sale to the United States in 1803, the political climate around Baton Rouge became precarious for Pintado. In 1804, three brothers, Samuel, Nathan and Reuben Kemper, wanting to separate this region from Spanish control and deliver it to the United States, attempted to foment a rebellion. On August 7, Samuel and Nathan Kemper marched on Baton Rouge with some 30 men to seize the fort.

According to the last treaty, Baton Rouge was under Spanish sovereignty, although most of its inhabitants were Anglos who preferred the sale of Louisiana to the United States. On hearing of the impending attack on Baton Rouge, the Spanish governor, Carlos de Grand Pré, prepared to defend Baton Rouge, forcing the withdrawal of the Kemper brothers to Bayou Sara, which was still under the command of Pintado. The rebels subsequently captured the settlement, burning its houses and a cotton mill. Pintado managed to escape and led a detachment of troops to harass those Americans who supported Kemper, forcing the insurgents to withdraw above the 31st parallel of latitude north, into the Territory of Mississippi. The Kemper brothers, undaunted by this setback, organized another assault the following year, with Ruben Kemper moving to the Bahamas where he solicited the British government for aid in expelling the Spanish from Baton Rouge. Pintado assisted in repelling this latest intrusion by the rebels, and on September 3, 1805, Nathan and Samuel Kemper were arrested by the Spanish authorities.

Florida 
 
Pintado served as assistant surveyor of Spanish West Florida from 1803 to 1805. Recognized by the Spanish authorities for his ability in this office, Pintado was named surveyor general of West Florida on October 9, 1805, his appointment being confirmed on December 13. Carlos Trudeau, the surveyor general of Louisiana, had previously been selected for the position, but because of his advanced age and family ties in Louisiana, refused a relocation to Pensacola. Trudeau and his former assistant Pintado divided possession all maps, plats and documents pertaining to official land measurements, Pintado keeping those related to the Floridas and Trudeau those concerning Louisiana.

 
Cádiz issued a royal order on October 28, 1812, awarding Pintado the title of Captain  of Infantry, which made him a full army officer. In the same year, a decree by the Spanish authorities mandated the renaming of plazas and streets in Pensacola, as well the construction of a new church and government buildings. Consequently, Pintado elaborated a street map of the town, the so-called "Pintado plan", which later received the approval of the city council on December 7, 1813. Also in 1812, governor Mauricio de Zúñiga sent Captain Pintado to investigate and recover any runaway slaves belonging to Spanish owners in East and West Florida.

After the defeat of British Admiral Sir Alexander Cochrane by United States forces at the Battle of New Orleans in January 1815, the new governor of Florida, Mateo González Manrique, instructed Pintado to travel to Apalachicola to confer with Cochrane. As a result, Cochrane ordered the return of all slaves and Spanish troops captured by the British to Pensacola aboard one of his ships under the command of Richard Spencer. Pintado accompanied the troops and slaves on the passage, and participated with Spencer in talks with slave owners about the British compensation. Following the success of this expedition, Pintado once again turned his attention to surveying and drew several maps based on recent military operations on the Apalachicola River.

Pintado continued serving as surveyor general until 1817, at which time he was transferred to Havana, Cuba, where he pursued his career as a military engineer, and he and his bride began their married life.

In Havana 
In Havana, Pintado continued his work of certifying and recording land surveys made in West Florida and Louisiana. He also drew a map of the territory stretching from Mobile, Alabama to the Mississippi River, showing British naval landing operations from 1814 to 1815 during the battle of New Orleans.

In 1822, the Captain General of Cuba, Nicolas Mahy, ordered Pintado to prepare a file containing descriptions of all distributions of land, including solares and water rights, made in both the Floridas under the administration of the Spanish government from 1801 - 1818. Pintado completed this project in 1823. A copy was handed over to the American authorities as part of Article II of the Treaty of 1819. In April 1828, the American minister in Madrid, Alexander Hill Everett, asked Spanish Secretary of State Manuel González Salmón for a copy of Pintado's work. The following April, the Spanish Minister Francisco Tacón wrote from Philadelphia that United States Secretary of State Martin van Buren had requested a copy of Pintado's work, consisting of 120 items concerning the distribution and granting of land in the Floridas (1808–18), certified in Havana.

Pintado remained in Havana, retaining his original copy of the file despite the claims of the Americans. In 1829, aware of his failing health, he informed his wife Eulalia Balderas of the existence of these papers, and told her that in case of his death, she should not copy or give information about them to anyone, except in exchange for money to support the family, including their four children.

Pintado died in Havana on August 20, 1829.

Personal life 
In 1816, when Pintado was 42 years old, he married a native of Louisiana, Maria Teresa Eulalia Balderas y Dubuisson, whose father, Ignacio Balderas (born in Salamanca, Spain) had served with Pintado in Pensacola as captain of Infantry of the Fixed Regiment of Louisiana. They had four children.

After his death
In 1830, Pintado's widow sold the exclusive file to land speculators in Louisiana, Florida and Missouri. Apparently the American government had refused to pay the $15,000 she demanded, so she sold them to the highest bidders.

As noted by Dr. R. Hébert, in 1841 General John Wilson was in possession of these documents, comprising 62 maps and plats bound in a leather portfolio addressed to "John Wilson".

Legacy: The Pintado Collection 
In 1974, the Pintado collection was donated to the Library of Congress in Washington, D.C.
The assemblage consists of about 1,500 items, including "correspondence, bills of sale, court transcripts, testimonies, surveys, notebooks, plats, land grants, maps, petitions, and other papers relating principally to Pintado's duties as mayor, commandant, and surveyor general."  Among these papers are records of properties and land in West Florida from the Mississippi River in Louisiana to the Pearl River (today the dividing line between the states of Mississippi and Louisiana), north of Lake Pontchartrain and the Gulf region in the present states of Mississippi, Alabama and Florida. The documents were compiled by Pintado during the sale of Louisiana, the occupation of West Florida by the British (1813–14) and the transfer of the Floridas by Spain to the United States in 1819, crucial years in the history of the region.

Of the 62 maps and plats in the Pintado Collection, 15 were drawn by Pintado himself. The remaining maps, plats, and cadastres were made by assistants under his supervision, and focus mainly on the regions around Baton Rouge, New Feliciana, Mobile and Pensacola, as well as Apalachicola Bay, which divided the two Floridas (West Florida extended to the Mississippi River). The collection also includes a copy of a plan made by the famous Spanish cartographer Tomás López, a map of the city and port of Saint Augustine, Florida, made in 1783.

Most of the papers are dated between 1799–1817, the period in which Pintado served as mayor and commander of New Feliciana near Baton Rouge, and later as Surveyor General of West Florida. Few of the Pintado documents date before 1799, and none of the official documents are dated after 1817, although there are applications for certificates of land grants in Louisiana and West Florida.

Additional Archival Materials
In the P. K. Yonge Library of Florida History, Special Collections, George A. Smathers Libraries, University of Florida, Gainesville, Florida, in the collection "Pioneer Days in Florida", there is a smaller collection of Pintado material: "Official records and correspondence of Vicente Sebastian Pintado, from 1817 to 1837. The letters and certifications in the collection pertain to land grants in Pensacola, Florida, and the liquidation of the estate of former Louisiana and West Florida Intendant Juan Ventura Morales. Also included is a lengthy diligencia on Pintado's own lands in Pensacola and an inventory of settlers who received land grants from the Spanish Crown."

References

External links 
 Pintado, Vicente Sebastián, 1774-1829

People from La Palma
People of Spanish Florida
People of Colonial Spanish Louisiana
People from West Feliciana Parish, Louisiana